Protein orai-2 is a protein that in humans is encoded by the ORAI2 gene.

References

Further reading